Hesper is an unincorporated community and ghost town in Benson County, North Dakota, United States.

References

Unincorporated communities in North Dakota
Populated places in Benson County, North Dakota